Floscopa is a genus of plants in the family Commelinaceae first described in 1790. It is widespread in tropical and subtropical areas: Africa, Madagascar, the Indian Subcontinent, Southeast Asia, China, Queensland, Central + South America.

 Species
 Floscopa africana (P.Beauv.) C.B.Clarke - from Liberia east to Uganda
 Floscopa aquatica Hua - from Sierra Leone + Mali east to Gabon
 Floscopa axillaris (Poir.) C.B.Clarke - West Africa from Senegal to Benin
 Floscopa confusa Brenan - from Ivory Coast to Tanzania
 Floscopa elegans Huber - Ecuador, Peru, northwestern Brazil
 Floscopa flavida C.B.Clarke - from Senegal to Tanzania and south to Botswana
 Floscopa glabrata (Kunth) Hassk. - Brazil, Paraguay, Argentina, Bolivia, Colombia, Costa Rica; naturalized in Vietnam
 Floscopa glomerata (Willd. ex Schult. & Schult.f.) Hassk. - most of sub-Saharan Africa; Madagascar
 Floscopa gossweileri Cavaco - Angola
 Floscopa leiothyrsa Brenan - Mali, Chad, Zaïre, Tanzania, Zambia, Botswana 
 Floscopa mannii C.B.Clarke - from Nigeria to Zaïre
 Floscopa perforans Rusby - Bolivia
 Floscopa peruviana Hassk. ex C.B.Clarke - Bolivia, Peru, Ecuador, Venezuela, Suriname, French Guinea 
 Floscopa polypleura Brenan - Ghana, Tanzania, Zambia
 Floscopa rivularioides T.C.E.Fr. - Zimbabwe
 Floscopa robusta (Seub.) C.B.Clarke  - Brazil, Colombia, Ecuador, Peru, Central America
 Floscopa scandens Lour. - China, Indian Subcontinent, Andaman & Nicobar Islands, Indochina, Malaysia, western Indonesia, Philippines, Queensland
 Floscopa schweinfurthii C.B.Clarke - Tanzania
 Floscopa tanneri Brenan - Zaïre, Tanzania
 Floscopa yunnanensis D.Y.Hong - Yunnan Province in China

References

 
Commelinales genera
Taxonomy articles created by Polbot